Bouguer may refer to:
Jean Bouguer (d. 1714), French hydrographer and mathematician
Pierre Bouguer (1698-1758), French mathematician, geophysicist, geodesist, and astronomer; son of Jean Bouguer
Bouguer (lunar crater), impact crater named after Pierre Bouguer
Bouguer (Martian crater), another impact crater named after Pierre Bouguer
8190 Bouguer, main-belt asteroid named after Pierre Bouguer